Christine Murray (born 23 September 1958), known professionally as Crissy Rock, is an English award-winning actress, stand-up comedian, and best-selling author, most notable for her role as Maggie Conlan in the 1994 film Ladybird, Ladybird, and as Janey York in Benidorm whom she played from 2007, until 2011 when she left the show, although she returned in Episode 6 of Series 5 for a cameo role, and then again for two episodes of Series 7 in 2015.

She appeared in I'm a Celebrity...Get Me Out of Here! 2011. In December 2012, she appeared on Celebrity Come Dine with Me. For her performance in Ladybird, Ladybird, she won the Silver Bear for Best Actress award at the 44th Berlin International Film Festival.

Career

Stage
Rock started her career as a comedian in the late 1980s. She appeared nationwide on Bob Monkhouse's BBC Television show Bob Says Opportunity Knocks,

By 1993, her career had started to take off. She performed her act in clubs in Blackpool, Newcastle, Birmingham, Leeds, Sheffield, Cardiff, and London. By 1994, Rock was bill-topping at the Central Pier and the Blackpool Tower.

In 1998, Rock toured the United Kingdom in a drama called Shellfish, in which she played the role of the pivotal female role of Pat. The Guardian newspaper wrote: Pat is an utterly believable portrayal of a woman making a last grab at happiness.

Following the success of the TV show Benidorm she returned to the UK in 2008 and continued to perform her stand-up act in clubs around the country. Rock's comedy has been described as "outrageous" and "emotional".

In 2011, Rock released her debut DVD: Crissy Rock – Live!, recorded at Liverpool's Royal Court Theatre. From December 2011 to January 2012, Rock played the role of the Fairy godmother in Billingham Forum's Christmas pantomime production of Cinderella.

In December 2013, Rock appeared as the Wicked Queen in a production of Snow White at Liverpool's Epstein Theatre.

On 15 March 2014, Rock led the cast of new comedy Dirty Dusting at the Bedworth Civic Hall. In April 2014, Rock starred alongside Duggie Brown in Escorts the musical at the Theatre Royal St Helens.Film and television
Rock's debut acting performance was as Maggie Conlan in Ken Loach's award-winning 1994 film Ladybird Ladybird. Loach later recalled: "I cannot think of anyone I have worked with who shines more brightly than Crissy Rock". Her performance won her numerous awards, including 'Best Actress' at the Berlin Film Festival, 'Best Actress' at London Film Critics Awards, and she received a 'Best Newcomer' nomination in the Evening Standard Awards.

In 1995, Rock appeared on primetime ITV in Peak Practice, Celebrity Squares and Funny Girls. She also performed on Sky One's Stand and Deliver. In 1996, she played Annie Greave in episode three of the BBC detective drama Dalziel and Pascoe, had a regular television role as nosy neighbour Anita Cartledge in Springhill , and starred alongside Julie Walters and Robert Lindsay in the BBC comedy play Brazen Hussies.

In 1997, she played alongside Billie Whitelaw in the six-part BBC1 series Born to Run. She also made regular appearances on Channel 4's game show Pull The Other One. In 1999, Rock played alongside Pete Postlethwaite in the BBC crime drama Butterfly Collectors, Nancy Banks-Smith who, writing in The Guardian said: “Crissy Rock..just switch her on and watch her go”. This was the first of two plays in which she featured in that year, the other was as Jean Walton in Jimmy McGovern's BAFTA nominated Channel 4 play Dockers, with Ken Stott and Ricky Tomlinson. In the same year, she was acclaimed for her presenting debut on BBC TV's Millennium Night Show with Michael Parkinson and Gaby Roslin.

In 2000, she played the regular role of the unnamed newsagent in the BBC One drama series Clocking Off. In 2001, Rock starred as Amber Costello during a four-week stint in Channel 4's soap opera Brookside. In 2002, she worked with Ricky Tomlinson again, when she played Madame Flo in his six-part BBC series Nice Guy Eddie. She also starred in a short film called Hero, which won the Hamburg and Dresden International Festivals in three categories, also the London International Film Festival for short subjects.

Following a five-year retirement from acting, Rock was cast, without audition, in the two part Closure episode of Lynda La Plante's Trial & Retribution series for ITV in 2007. The following year, Plante cast her in another of her TV productions: The Commander.

In 2006, Rock took on the role of loudmouthed hotel manageress Janey York in ITV's sitcom Benidorm. In 2012, Rock filmed "The Air That I Breathe", based on the 1970s TV series Hazell. Over the years, she has appeared in various feature films, including Under the Skin, with Samantha Morton, Act of Grace, in which she played Leo Gregory's mother, and A Boy Called Dad. She is currently filming three new films: In Search Of The Miraculous, Death Of An Angel  and Still Waters.

I'm a Celebrity...Get Me Out of Here!
Rock took part in the 11th series of I'm a Celebrity...Get Me Out of Here!. She came 6th and left on Day 19. On 8 December 2011, days after returning from Australia, she appeared on Gabby Logan's Channel 5 show Live with Gabby in which she reflected on her 19 days in the jungle, her weight loss and her DVD.

 Publications 
Rock published her autobiography This Heart Within Me Burns in 2011. Ghost written by author Ken Scott, the book was a best-seller in Britain, and Rock went on a book signing tour to promote it. The sales for the hardback edition hit 35,000, and it was subsequently released in paperback. This Heart Within Me Burns was described as 'an inspirational piece of literature'.

Encouraged by this success, Rock teamed up with Ken Scott again to pen the first of a series of novels centring on fictional journalist Samantha Kerr. The first book, Revenge Is Sweeter Than Flowing Honey'' was published in February 2014. Ken Scott has recently written: "Look out for more Sam Kerr in the not too distant future", suggesting that there are more books in the pipeline.

Stage and Screen Credits

Screen

Stage

Bibliography

References

External links

Unreality TV – News of Crissy Rock on I'm a Celebrity
British Comedy Guide
Benidorm at British TV Comedy

1958 births
Actresses from Liverpool
English autobiographers
English television actresses
English women non-fiction writers
Living people
Writers from Liverpool
Silver Bear for Best Actress winners
English women comedians
English film actresses
20th-century English actresses
21st-century English actresses
Women autobiographers
I'm a Celebrity...Get Me Out of Here! (British TV series) participants